Acopa is a genus of moths of the family Noctuidae. The genus was erected by Leon F. Harvey in 1875.

Species
 Acopa carina Harvey, 1875
 Acopa perpallida Grote, 1878

References

Hadeninae
Noctuoidea genera